The men's 1000 metres in short track speed skating at the 2018 Winter Olympics took place on 13 and 17 February 2018 at the Gangneung Ice Arena in Gangneung, South Korea. Samuel Girard won gold, John-Henry Krueger took the silver medal, and Seo Yi-ra won bronze. For all of them, this was their first Olympic medal.

Charles Hamelin set an Olympic record in the heats but was disqualified in semifinals. In Final A, Sándor Liu Shaolin, trying to pass from the inside, interfered with one of the competitors, which resulted in the fall of both Lim Hyo-jun and Seo Yi-ra. The two remaining contenders, Girard and Krueger, became gold and silver medalists. Liu Shaolin was disqualified, and Seo Yi-ra won the bronze medal by standing after the fall and crossing the finish line first.

Records
Prior to this competition, the existing world and Olympic records were as follows.

One Olympic record was set during the competition.

Results

Heats
 Q – qualified for the quarterfinals
 ADV – advanced
 PEN – penalty
 YC – yellow card
 OR - olympic record

Quarterfinals
 Q – qualified for Semifinals
 ADV – advanced
 PEN – penalty
 YC – yellow card

Semifinals
 QA – qualified for Final A
 QB – qualified for Final B
 ADV – advanced
 PEN – penalty
 YC – yellow card

Final B

Final A
The final was held on 17 February 2018 at 21:24.

References

Men's short track speed skating at the 2018 Winter Olympics